Bietak is a surname. Notable people with the surname include:

 Manfred Bietak (born 1940), Austrian archaeologist and professor
 Wilhelm Bietak (born 1947), Austrian pair skater and skating event producer